Cade is a gender-neutral given name of English origin meaning "stout" or "sturdy". It is currently the 97th most popular baby name, and 340th in the United States.

Cade

Given name
Cade Cavalli (born 1998), American baseball player
Cade Courtley (born 1969), American television host
Cade Cowell (born 2003), American soccer player
Cade Cunningham (born 2001), American basketball player
Cade Cust (born 1998), Australian rugby league footballer
Cade Davis (born 1988), American basketball player
Cade Doughty (born 2001), American baseball player
Cade Fairchild (born 1989), American ice hockey player
Cade Foehner (born 1996), American singer
Cade Foster (born 1991), American football player
Cade Horton (born 2001), American baseball player
Cade Johnson (born 1999), American football player
Cade Klubnik (born 2003), American football player
Cade Mays (born 1999), American football player
Cade McNamara (born 2000), American football player
Cade McNown (born 1977), American football player
Cade Otton (born 1999), American football player
Cade York (born 2001), American football player

Surname
Adrian Cade (born 1961), English cricketer
Cathy Cade (born 1942), American photographer
Ebb Cade (1890–1953), American construction worker
Elsa Salazar Cade (born 1952), Mexican-American teacher
Giancarlo Cadé (1930–2019), Italian footballer
Jack Cade (??–1450), English rebel
Jack Cade (scout), American scout
James Cade, Canadian actor
Jamie Cade (born 1984), English footballer
Joe Cade (1900–??), American baseball player
John Cade (disambiguation), multiple people
Lance Cade (1981–2010), American professional wrestler
Lionel Cade (1918–1990), American accountant
Marilyn Cade (1947–2020), American activist
Marina Cade (born 1969), Australian rower
Michael Cade (born 1972), American actor
Mossy Cade (born 1961), American football player
Phil Cade (1916–2001), American race car driver
Robert Cade (1927–2007), American physician
Rosana Cade, British performance artist
Rowena Cade (1893–1983), English theatre director
Stanford Cade (1895–1973), British surgeon
Tom Cade (1928–2019), American ornithologist
William Cade (1883–1957), Australian conductor
William H. Cade, American zoologist

Fictional characters
 Cade Skywalker, a character in the Star Wars: Legacy comic book series

Kade

Given name
Kade Chandler (born 2000), Australian rules footballer
Kade Craig (born 2002), English footballer
Kade Dykes, Australian rugby league footballer
Kade Harvey (born 1975), Australian cricketer
Kade Kolodjashnij (born 1995), Australian rules footballer
Kade McClure (born 1996), American baseball player
Kade Munday (born 1983), Australian cricketer
Kade Poki (born 1988), New Zealand rugby union footballer
Kade Ruotolo (born 2003), American grappler
Kade Simpson (born 1984), Australian rules footballer
Kade Snowden (born 1986), Australian rugby league footballer
Kade Stewart (born 1997), Australian rules footballer
Kade L. Twist (born 1971), Native American artist
Kade Weston (born 1986), American football player
Kade Wolhuter (born 2001), South African rugby union footballer

Surname
Anton Kade (born 2004), German footballer
Arthur Kade, American financial advisor
Julius Kade (born 1999), German footballer
Max Kade (1882–1967), German pharmacist
Otto Kade (1819–1900), German musicologist
Stacey Kade, American author

Other uses
 Administrative Council for Economic Defense, a Brazilian antitrust regulator, commonly known as Cade
 Cade (horse), a racehorse
 Customer Account Data Engine, a tax database in the United States

See also 
Caden, a town in France
Caden (given name), a page for people with the given name "Caden"
Cadence (disambiguation), a disambiguation page for "Cadence"

References

Hypocorisms